Atul Parchure is an Indian actor who performs in films and television serials. Atul Parchure is an Indian movie, television, and theater actor. He is mainly known for his comedic roles in Marathi and Bollywood film industry. Although he is mainly seen working in movies, he has played like Vasu Chi Sasu, Priyatama, and Tarun Turk Mhatare Arka to his credit. He has worked alongside various actors and is seen playing supporting roles. Some of his work can be seen in the movies Navra Mazha Navsacha, Salaam-E-Ishq, Partner, All the Best: Fun Begins, Khatta Meetha, Bbuddah... Hoga Terra Baap, and Brave Heart. His 2017 release includes the Marathi drama film Conditions Apply - Ati Lagu. Directed by Girish Mohite, the movie along with Atul Parchure stars Subodh Bhave, Radhika Vidyasagar and Dipti Srikanth in the lead.

He recently began working for Zee Marathi's popular show Jaago Mohan Pyare along with Supriya Pathare and Shruti Marathe. He also done a lead role in Bhago Mohan Pyare on Zee Marathi which is the sequel of Jaago Mohan Pyare. He received Best Actor and Best Comedy Character Awards in Zee Marathi Utsav Natyancha Awards 2019 by this serial.

Films

Theater

Television
R. K. Laxman Ki Duniya - Bhavesh Vasavda
Comedy Nights with Kapil - various characters
Comedy Circus (season) - Himself
Comedy Circus Ke Ajoobe - Guest performance with Rajiv Thakur, Paresh Ganatra, Sunil Grover
Bh Se Bhade - Bhimsen Ganguly (Boss)
Badi Door Se Aaye Hai - Ghost (cameo)
Yam Hain Hum - Chitragupt
Honar Sun Me Hya Gharchi - Sadanand Borkar (Janhavi's Boss)
Jago Mohan Pyaare - Mohan Mhatre
Bhago Mohan Pyare - Mohan Ashtaputre
Ali Mili Gupchili - Host 
Majha Hoshil Na - J.D. (Jaywant Desai)

References

External links

 
 

Living people
Male actors from Mumbai
Male actors in Hindi cinema
Indian male comedians
21st-century Indian male actors
1966 births
Male actors in Marathi television